

E

 

Eakerite (IMA1969-019) 9.CG.05    
Earlandite (citrate: 1936) 10.AC.10    (IUPAC: calcium citrate tetrahydrate)
Earlshannonite (arthurite: IMA1983-010) 8.DC.15    (IUPAC: manganese(II) diiron(III) dihydro diphosphate tetrahydrate)
Eastonite (mica: IMA1998 s.p., 1925 Rd) 9.EC.20   [no] (IUPAC: potassium aluminium dimagnesium (dialuminodisilicate) decaoxy dihydroxyl)
Ecandrewsite (corundum: IMA1978-082) 4.CB.05    (IUPAC: zinc titanium trioxide)
Ecdemite (Y: 1877) 3.DC.65    (IUPAC: hexalead heptaoxodiarsenate(III) tetrachloride)
Eckerite (xanthoconite: IMA2014-063) 2.0  [no] [no] (IUPAC: disilver copper trisulfa arsenide)
Eckermannite [Na-amphibole: IMA2013-136, IMA2012 s.p., 1942] 9.DE.25   
Eckhardite (tellurium oxysalt: IMA2012-085) 7.C?.  [no] [no]
Eclarite (kobellite: IMA1982-092) 2.HB.10c     (IUPAC: (copper,iron) nonalead octaicosasulfa dodecabismuthide)
Écrinsite (sartorite: IMA2015-099) 2.0  [no] [no]
Eddavidite (IMA2018-010) 3.DB.45  [no] [no]
Edenharterite (IMA1987-026) 2.HD.35    (IUPAC: thallium lead hexasulfa triarsenide)
Edenite [Ca-amphibole: IMA2012 s.p., 1839] 9.DE.15   
Edgarbaileyite (IMA1988-028) 9.BC.25    (IUPAC: tri(dimercury) heptaoxodisilicate)
Edgarite (IMA1995-017) 2.DB.25    (IUPAC: iron triniobium hexasulfide)
Edgrewite (humite: IMA2011-058) 9.0  [no] [no] (IUPAC: nonacalcium tetra(tetraoxosilicate) difluoride)
Edingtonite (zeolitic tectosilicate: 1825) 9.GA.15    (IUPAC: barium (dialuminotrisilicate) decaoxy tetrahydrate)
Edoylerite (IMA1987-008) 7.FB.25    (IUPAC: trimercury(II) tetraoxochromate(VI) disulfide)
Edscottite (carbide: IMA2018-086a) 1.0  [no] [no] (IUPAC: pentairon dicarbide)
Edtollite (IMA2016-010) 8.0  [no] (IUPAC: dipotassium sodium pentacopper iron(III) dioxotetrarsenate)
Edwardsite (IMA2009-048) 7.DD.30  [no]  (IUPAC: tricopper dicadmium hexahydro disulfate tetrahydrate)
Effenbergerite (gillespite: IMA1993-036) 9.EA.05   [no] (IUPAC: barium copper decaoxotetrasilicate)
Efremovite (langbeinite: IMA1987-033a) 7.AC.10    (IUPAC: diammonium dimagnesium trisulfate)
Eggletonite (IMA1982-059) 9.EG.30   
Eglestonite (Y: 1904) 3.DD.05    (IUPAC: tri(dimercury) hydro oxotrichloride)
Ehrleite (IMA1983-039) 8.CA.10    (IUPAC: dicalcium zinc beryllium diphosphate hydroxophosphate(V) tetrahydrate)
Eifelite (milarite: IMA1980-097) 9.CM.05    (IUPAC: potassium disodium (magnesium sodium) (trimagnesium dodecasilicate) triacontaoxy)
Eirikite (leifite: IMA2007-017) 9.EH.25   
Eitelite (Y: 1955) 5.AC.05    (IUPAC: disodium magnesium dicarbonate)
Ekanite (amorphous: IMA1967 s.p., 1961) 9.EA.10    (IUPAC: dicalcium thorium icosaoxoctasilicate)
Ekaterinite (IMA1979-067) 6.H0.40    (IUPAC: dicalcium dichloro heptaoxotetraborate dihydrate)
Ekatite (ellenbergite: IMA1998-024) 4.JB.75   [no]
Ekebergite (IMA2018-088) 4.0  [no] [no]
Ekplexite (valleriite: IMA2011-082) 2.0  [no] 
Elasmochloite (IMA2018-015) 7.0  [no] [no]
Elbaite (tourmaline: 1913) 9.CK.05   
Elbrusite (garnet: IMA2012 s.p., IMA2009-051) 4.0  [no] [no]
Eldfellite (zinkosite: IMA2007-051) 7.AC.15    (IUPAC: sodium iron(III) disulfate)
Eldragónite (IMA2010-077) 2.0  [no]  (IUPAC: hexacopper bismuth tetraselenide diselenide)
Eleomelanite (IMA2015-118) 7.0  [no] [no] (IUPAC: (dipotassium lead) tetracopper dioxotetrasulfate)
Elgoresyite (IMA2020-086) 4.BB.  [no] [no]
Eliopoulosite (IMA2019-096) 2.0  [no] [no] (IUPAC: heptavanadium octasulfide)
Eliseevite (IMA2010-031) 9.DB.17  [no] [no]
Ellenbergerite (ellenbergerite: IMA1984-066) 9.AF.80   
Ellinaite (IMA2019-091) 4.0  [no] [no] (IUPAC: calcium dichromium tetraoxide)
Ellingsenite (IMA2009-041) 9.E?.  [no] 
Elliottite (IMA2021-113) 8.DD.  [no] [no]
Ellisite (IMA1977-041) 2.JC.05    (IUPAC: trithallium arsenide trisulfide)
Elpasolite (double perovskite: 1883) 3.CB.15    (IUPAC: dipotassium sodium hexafluoroaluminate) 
Elpidite (Y: 1894) 9.DG.65   
Eltyubyuite (mayenite: IMA2011-022) 9.AD.25  [no] 
Elyite (IMA1971-043) 7.DF.65    (IUPAC: copper tetralead sulfate monohydrate)
Embreyite (IMA1971-048) 7.FC.20    (IUPAC: pentalead dioxo tetrahydro dichromate diphosphate monohydrate)
Emeleusite (IMA1977-021) 9.DN.05    (IUPAC: disodium lithium iron(III) pentadecaoxohexasilicate)
Emilite (meneghinite: IMA2001-015) 2.HB.05a   [no] (	Cu10.7Pb10.7Bi21.3S48)
Emmerichite (seidozerite, lamprophyllite: IMA2013-064) 9.BE.  [no] [no]
Emmonsite (tellurite: 1885) 4.JM.10    (IUPAC: diiron(III) tritellurate(IV) dihydrate)
Emplectite (chalcostibite: 1855) 2.HA.05    (IUPAC: copper(I) disulfa bismuthide)
Empressite (IMA1964 s.p., 1914 Rd) 2.CB.80    (IUPAC: silver telluride)
Enargite (wurzite: 1850) 2.KA.05    (IUPAC: tricopper tetrasulfa arsenide)
Engelhauptite (polyvanate: IMA2013-009) 8.0  [no] [no] (IUPAC: potassium tricopper dihydro chloro (heptaoxodivanadate))
Englishite (Y: 1930) 8.DH.55   
Enneasartorite (sartorite: IMA2015-074) 2.0  [no] [no]
Enstatite (pyroxene: IMA1988 s.p., 1855) 9.DA.05    (IUPAC: dimagnesium hexaoxodisilicate)
Eosphorite (childrenite: 1878) 8.DD.20    (IUPAC: manganese(II) aluminium dihydro phosphate monohydrate)
Ephesite (mica: IMA1998 s.p., 1851) 9.EC.20    (IUPAC: sodium lithium dialuminium (dialumodisilicate) decaoxy dihydroxyl)
Epididymite (Y: 1893) 9.DG.55    (IUPAC: disodium diberyllium pentadecaoxohexasilicate monohydrate)
Epidote (epidote) 9.BG.05x
Epidote (1801) 9.BG.05a    (IUPAC: dicalcium (dialuminum iron(III)) heptaoxodisilicate tetraoxosilicate oxy hydroxyl)
Epidote-(Sr) (IMA2006-055) 9.BG.05    (IUPAC: calcium strontium (dialuminum iron(III)) heptaoxodisilicate tetraoxosilicate oxy hydroxyl)
Epifanovite (andyrobertsite: IMA2016-063) 8.0  [no] [no] (IUPAC: sodium calcium pentacopper tetraphosphate dihydroxoarsenate(V) heptahydrate)
Epistilbite (zeolitic tectosilicate: IMA1997 s.p., 1826) 9.GD.45   
Epistolite (seidozerite, lamprophyllite: 1901) 9.BE.30   
Epsomite (epsomite: 1721) 7.CB.40    (IUPAC: magnesium sulfate heptahydrate)
Erazoite (IMA2014-061) 2.0  [no] [no] (IUPAC: tetracopper hexasulfa stannide)
Ercitite (IMA1999-036) 8.DJ.35   [no] (IUPAC: sodium manganese(III) hydro phosphate dihydrate)
Erdite (IMA1977-048) 2.FD.20    (IUPAC: sodium iron sulfide dihydrate)
Ericaite (boracite: 1950) 6.GA.05    (IUPAC: triiron(II) chloro tridecaoxoheptaborate)
Ericlaxmanite (IMA2013-022) 8.0  [no] [no] (IUPAC: tetracopper oxodiarsenate)
Ericssonite (lamprophyllite: IMA1966-013 Rd) 9.BE.25    (IUPAC: barium dimanganese(II) iron(III) heptaoxodisilicate oxy hydroxyl)
Erikapohlite (alluaudite: IMA2010-090) 8.0  [no] [no] ((☐0.5Cu0.5)CuCaZn2(AsO4)3·H2O)
Erikjonssonite (IMA2018-058) 3.0  [no] [no]
Eringaite (garnet, garnet: IMA2009-054) 9.AD.  [no]  (IUPAC: tricalcium discandium tri(tetraoxosilicate))
Eriochalcite (Y: 1870) 3.BB.05    (IUPAC: copper dichloride dihydrate)
Erionite (zeolitic tectosilicate) 9.GD.20
Erionite-Ca (IMA1997 s.p.) 9.GD.20   [no]
Erionite-K (IMA1997 s.p.) 9.GD.20   
Erionite-Na (IMA1997 s.p., 1898) 9.GD.20   [no]
Erlianite (IMA1985-042) 9.HC.05    (IUPAC: tetrairon(II) diiron(III) pentadecaoxohexasilicate octahydroxyl)
Erlichmanite (pyrite: IMA1970-048) 2.EB.05a    (IUPAC: osmium disulfide)
Ermakovite (IMA2020-054) 4.0  [no] [no]
Ernienickelite (IMA1993-002) 4.FL.20    (IUPAC: nickel trimanganese(IV) heptaoxide trihydrate)
Erniggliite (IMA1987-025) 2.GA.45    (IUPAC: dithallium tin hexasulfa diarsenide)
Ernstburkeite (IMA2010-059) 10.0  [no] 
Ernstite (childrenite: IMA1970-012) 8.DD.20    (IUPAC: (manganese(II),iron(II)) aluminium di(hydro,oxo) phosphate)
Ershovite (IMA1991-014) 9.DF.15   
Erssonite (hydrotalcite: IMA2021-016) 7.DF.  [no] [no]
Ertixiite (IMA1983-042) 9.HA.05    (IUPAC: disodium nonaoxotetrasilicate)
Erythrite (vivianite: 1832) 8.CE.40    (IUPAC: tricobalt diarsenate octahydrate)
Erythrosiderite (Y: 1872) 3.CJ.10    (IUPAC: dipotassium iron(III) pentachloride monohydrate)
Erzwiesite (lillianite: IMA2012-082) 2.0  [no] [no](IUPAC: octasilver dodecalead tetracontasulfa hexadecabismuthide)
Escheite (zorite: IMA2018-099) 9.DG.  [no] [no]
Esdanaite-(Ce) (IMA2018-112) 8.0  [no] [no]
Eskebornite (chalcopyrite: 1950) 2.CB.10a    (IUPAC: copper iron diselenide)
Eskimoite (lillianite: IMA1976-005) 2.JB.40b    (IUPAC: heptasilver decalead hexatricontasulfa pentadecabismuthide)
Eskolaite (corundum: 1958) 4.CB.05    (IUPAC: chromium(III) oxide)
Espadaite (IMA2018-089) 8.CF.  [no] [no]
Esperanzaite (IMA1998-025) 8.DM.05    (IUPAC: sodium dicalcium dialuminium tetrafluoro hydro diarsenate dihydrate)
Esperite (beryllonite: IMA1964-027) 9.AB.15    (IUPAC: lead dicalcium tri[zinc tetraoxosilicate])
Esquireite (IMA2014-066) 9.E?.  [no] [no] (IUPAC: barium tridecaoxohexasilicate heptahydrate)
Esseneite (pyroxene: IMA1985-048) 9.DA.15    (IUPAC: calcium iron(III) aluminohexaoxosilicate)
Ettringite (ettringite: IMA1962 s.p., 1874) 7.DG.15    (IUPAC: hexacalcium dialuminium dodecahydro trisulfate hexaicosahydrate)
Eucairite (Y: 1818) 2.BA.50    (IUPAC: copper silver selenide)
Euchlorine (euchlorine: 1884) 7.BC.30    (IUPAC: potassium sodium tricopper oxotrisulfate)
Euchroite (Y: 1823) 8.DC.07    (IUPAC: dicopper hydro arsenate trihydrate)
Euclase (Y: 1792) 9.AE.10    (IUPAC: beryllium aluminium tetraoxosilicate hydroxyl)
Eucryptite (phenakite: 1880) 9.AA.05    (IUPAC: lithium aluminium tetraoxosilicate)
Eudialyte (eudialyte: IMA2003 s.p., 1819) 9.CO.10   
Eudidymite (Y: 1887) 9.DG.60    (IUPAC: disodium diberyllium pentadecaoxohexasilicate monohydrate)
Eugenite (amalgam: IMA1981-037) 1.AD.15c    (IUPAC: undecasilver dimercury amalgam)
Eugsterite (IMA1980-008) 7.CD.25    (IUPAC: tetrasodium calcium trisulfate dihydrate)
Eulytine (Y: 1827) 9.AD.40    (IUPAC: tetrabismuth tri(tetraoxosilicate))
Eurekadumpite (tellurite-arsenate: IMA2009-072) 8.0  [no]  (IUPAC: hexadeca(copper,zinc) octadecahydro chloro ditellurate(IV) triarsenate heptahydrate)
Euxenite-(Y) (columbite: IMA1987 s.p., 1840) 4.DG.05   
EvansiteQ (amorphous: 1864) 8.DF.10    (IUPAC: trialuminium hexahydro phosphate octahydrate)
Evdokimovite (IMA2013-041) 7.0  [no] [no] (IUPAC: tetrathallium tri(oxovanadate) pentasulfate pentawater)
Eveite (andalusite: IMA1966-047) 8.BB.30    (IUPAC: dimanganese(II) hydroarsenate)
Evenkite (Y: 1953) 10.BA.50   
Evseevite (moraskoite: IMA2019-064) 8.0  [no] [no] (IUPAC: disodium magnesium fluoro arsenate)
Eveslogite (IMA2001-023) 9.DG.97   [no]
Ewaldite (IMA1969-013) 5.CC.05   
Ewingite (hydrous uranyl carbonate: IMA2016-012) 5.0  [no] [no]
Eylettersite (alunite, crandallite: IMA1969-035) 8.BL.10   
Eyselite (IMA2003-052) 4.DM.20   [no] (IUPAC: iron(III) trigermanium(IV) hydro heptaoxide)
Ezcurrite (Y: 1957) 6.EB.10    (IUPAC: disodium trihydroheptaoxopentaborate dihydrate)
Eztlite (tellurite-tellurium oxysalt: IMA1980-072) 4.JN.20    (IUPAC: dilead hexairon(III) decahydro tritellurate(IV) hexaoxotellurate(VI) octahydrate)

External links
IMA Database of Mineral Properties/ RRUFF Project
Mindat.org - The Mineral Database
Webmineral.com
Mineralatlas.eu minerals E